Bakino is a rural locality (a village) in Andreyevskoye Rural Settlement, Alexandrovsky District, Vladimir Oblast, Russia. The population was 112 as of 2010. There are 7 streets.

Geography 
Bakino is located 19 km southeast of Alexandrov (the district's administrative centre) by road. Ryasnitsyno is the nearest rural locality.

References 

Rural localities in Alexandrovsky District, Vladimir Oblast
Alexandrovsky Uyezd (Vladimir Governorate)